Solid Air may refer to:

Solid Air, a 1973 folk-jazz album by British singer-songwriter and guitarist John Martyn
Solid Air B.V., a Dutch airline that flies Canadair CRJ-100 Series and Dornier Do-328 aircraft
Solid Air UL-Bau Franz, a German aircraft manufacturer